The Acher Valley Railway is a 10.4 km long branch line from Achern to Ottenhöfen im Schwarzwald in the Black Forest in Germany that branches off the Rhine Valley Railway.

External links 
 Acher Valley Railway Society (Achertäler Eisenbahnverein)
 Description of the Acher Valley Railway line
 2010 Deutsche Bahn timetable – route timetable including steam trains

Railway lines in Baden-Württemberg
Heritage railways in Germany
Ortenaukreis